Danielle Rieder (born 14 March 1961) is a Swiss former competitive figure skater. She placed in the top ten at four European Championships, won two medals at the International St. Gervais and three Swiss national titles. Rieder was selected to compete at two Winter Olympics. She withdrew from the 1976 event in Innsbruck following the compulsory figures, in which she placed 16th, but completed all segments at the 1980 event in Lake Placid, New York and finished 14th overall.

Competitive highlights

References 

1961 births
Swiss female single skaters
Living people
People from La Chaux-de-Fonds
Olympic figure skaters of Switzerland
Figure skaters at the 1976 Winter Olympics
Figure skaters at the 1980 Winter Olympics
Sportspeople from the canton of Neuchâtel